Berlin-Albrechtshof is a railway station located in Staaken, a locality in the Spandau district of Berlin. It is one of only two Deutsche Bahn stations in Berlin not served by the S-Bahn; Staaken station is the other.

Overview
The station is situated on the Berlin–Hamburg railway, between the stations of Berlin Spandau and Seegefeld.

The station has two side platforms for passenger service, served by the local trains RB10 (in 2014: Berlin Hauptbahnhof - Jungfernheide - Nauen) and RB14 (Senftenberg-Nauen). The regional express trains do not call here.

On 5 December 1961, Albrechtshof station was the scene of the successful escape of a Reichsbahn steam-engine driver, who managed to overcome the barriers erected in August that year. As a consequence of the escape of 25 GDR citizens to West-Berlin, 20 metres of track were removed to prevent another breakthrough. The event was the basis for a 1963 film, The Breakthrough.

Train services
The station is served by the following services:

Local services  Nauen – Falkensee – Berlin
Local services  Nauen – Falkensee – Berlin – Berlin-Schönefeld Flughafen – Königs Wusterhausen – Senftenberg

See also
List of railway stations in the Berlin area

References

Railway stations in Berlin
Buildings and structures in Spandau
Berlin-Albrechtshof
Berlin S-Bahn stations